Cornbrook station may refer to:

Cornbrook Metrolink station, open station on Manchester's Metrolink system
Cornbrook railway station, disused station in Manchester